Joan Isaacs is a Canadian politician who was elected to the Legislative Assembly of British Columbia in the 2017 provincial election. She represented the electoral district of Coquitlam-Burke Mountain as a member of the British Columbia Liberal Party caucus until the 2020 provincial election, in which she was defeated by Fin Donnelly of the British Columbia New Democratic Party.

Electoral record

References

British Columbia Liberal Party MLAs
Living people
People from Coquitlam
Women MLAs in British Columbia
21st-century Canadian politicians
21st-century Canadian women politicians
Year of birth missing (living people)